Three Lucky Fools (Italian: Tre uomini in frack) is a 1933 French-Italian comedy film directed by Mario Bonnard and starring Tito Schipa, Eduardo De Filippo, and Fred Pasquali. It marked the film debut of Assia Noris, who went on to be a leading Italian star.

It was released in two separate versions, one in French and the other in Italian.

Cast
 Tito Schipa as Il tenore Marcello Palma 
 Eduardo De Filippo as Gilberto, l'impresario 
 Fred Pasquali as Gilbert
 Peppino De Filippo as Andrea 
 Simone Vaudry as Lucy 
 Assia Noris as La giovane americana 
 Jeanne Perriat as Mme. Laure 
 Jean Gobet as André 
 Maria Wronska as Signora Laura, la padrona del tabarin 
 Charles Dechamps as Le journaliste 
 Milly as Lucia 
 Camillo Pilotto as Il giornalista

Citations

General bibliography 
 Gundle, Stephen. Mussolini's Dream Factory: Film Stardom in Fascist Italy. Berghahn Books, 2013.

External links 
 

1933 films
French comedy films
Italian comedy films
French black-and-white films
1933 comedy films
1930s Italian-language films
Films directed by Mario Bonnard
Italian black-and-white films
Films produced by Seymour Nebenzal
1930s French films
1930s Italian films